The 2022 Clean Harbors 150 presented by Premier Chevy Dealers was the thirteenth stock car race of the 2022 NASCAR Camping World Truck Series, and the second iteration of the event. The race was held on Saturday, June 18, 2022, in Knoxville, Iowa at Knoxville Raceway, a  permanent oval dirt track. The race took its scheduled 150 laps to complete. Todd Gilliland, driving for his father's team, David Gilliland Racing, held off John Hunter Nemechek on the final restart, and earned his 3rd career NASCAR Camping World Truck Series win, along with his first of the season. To fill out the podium, Zane Smith, driving for Front Row Motorsports, would finish in 3rd.

Background 
Knoxville Raceway is a semi-banked 1/2 mile dirt oval raceway (zook clay) located at the Marion County Fairgrounds in Knoxville, Iowa, United States.  Races at the "Sprint Car Capital of the World" are held on Saturday nights from April through September each year. Some special events such as the Knoxville Nationals, 360 Knoxville Nationals and Late Model Knoxville Nationals are multi-day events. Weekly racing events at the track features multiple classes of sprint cars including 410 cubic inch, 360 cubic inch and Pro Sprints (previously 305 cubic inch). Each August, the Raceway holds the paramount sprint car event in the United States, the Knoxville Nationals. The track is governed by the 24-member fair board elected by Marion County residents.

Entry list 

 (R) denotes rookie driver.
 (i) denotes driver who are ineligible for series driver points.

Practice

First practice 
The first 50-minute was held on Friday, June 17, at 6:05 PM CST.

Final practice 
The final 25-minute practice session was held on Friday, June 17, at 8:02 PM CST.

Qualifying 
Qualifying was held on Saturday, June 18, at 6:00 PM CST. For qualifying, drivers will be split into four different 15 lap heat races, and their finishing position will determine the starting lineup. John Hunter Nemechek, Carson Hocevar, Hailie Deegan, and Todd Gilliland would win the 4 heat races, as Derek Kraus would win the pole.

Race 1

Race 2

Race 3

Race 4

Starting lineup

Race results 
Stage 1 Laps: 40

Stage 2 Laps: 50

Stage 3 Laps: 60

Standings after the race 

Drivers' Championship standings

Note: Only the first 10 positions are included for the driver standings.

References 

2022 NASCAR Camping World Truck Series
NASCAR races at Knoxville Raceway
Clean Harbors 150
Clean Harbors 150